Fairfield Airport may refer to:

Fairfield Airport in Fairfield, Montana, United States (FAA: 5U5)
Fairfield Municipal Airport (Illinois) in Fairfield, Illinois, United States (FAA: FWC)
Fairfield Municipal Airport (Iowa) in Fairfield, Iowa, United States (FAA: FFL)

See also
 Fairfield County Airport (disambiguation)
 Fairfield Municipal Airport (disambiguation)